Chaux-la-Lotière is a commune in the Haute-Saône department in the region of Bourgogne-Franche-Comté in eastern France. The 20th-century French archaeologist Roland Martin (1912–1997) was born in Chaux-la-Lotière.

See also
Communes of the Haute-Saône department

References

Communes of Haute-Saône